Stover House, also known as Fort Stover, is a historic home located near Luray, Page County, Virginia. It is dated to the late-18th century, and is a two-story, three bay, rubble stone structure with a traditional Flurkuchenhaus plan.  It has a basement that projects its full height above grade on the river side. Located off the basement is a vaulted room.  It is considered among the best preserved and least altered of the important group of 18th-century log and stone German houses of the Massanutten Settlement.

It was listed on the National Register of Historic Places in 1978.

References

External links
Fort Stover, State Route 660 vicinity, Luray, Page County, VA: 5 photos, 12 measured drawings, and 4 data pages at Historic American Buildings Survey

Houses on the National Register of Historic Places in Virginia
Houses in Page County, Virginia
National Register of Historic Places in Page County, Virginia
Historic American Buildings Survey in Virginia